The 2024 European Athletics Championships will be the 26th edition of the European Athletics Championships and will be held in Rome, Italy, from 7 to 12 June 2024.

The Italian capital was preferred to the city of Katowice in Poland. It is the second time that Rome hosts this sporting event, fifty years after the 1974 edition.

References

External links

Fondazione Euro Roma
European Championships website
EAA Official website

European Championships
2024 in European sport
2024 in Italian sport
 
European Championships, 2024
Sports competitions in Rome
European Athletics Championships
2024